Gérard Aké Loba (15 August 1927 in Abobo, in the Abobo Baoule neighborhood – 3 August 2012 in Aix-en-Provence, France) was an Ivorian diplomat and writer. He won the Grand prix littéraire d'Afrique noire in 1961.

He was also a member of the parliament and mayor of the town of Abobo in Abidjan from 1985 to 1990.

Bibliography 
 1960 : Kocoumbo, l’étudiant noir, Paris, Flammarion
 1966 : Les fils de Kouretcha, Brussels, Editions de la Francité
 1973 : Les Dépossédés, Brussels, Editions de la Francité
 1992 : Le Sas des parvenus, Paris, Flammarion

References

1927 births
2012 deaths
Ivorian male writers
Mayors of places in Ivory Coast
Members of the National Assembly (Ivory Coast)
Male novelists
20th-century novelists
20th-century male writers
People from Abidjan
Ivorian novelists